Francisco Jiménez (18 December 1893 – 6 May 1973) was a Spanish equestrian. He competed in two events at the 1928 Summer Olympics.

References

1893 births
1973 deaths
Spanish male equestrians
Olympic equestrians of Spain
Equestrians at the 1928 Summer Olympics
Sportspeople from Las Palmas